This is a list of works by Clifton Johnson, American author, illustrator, and photographer. The works are divided into sections based on Johnson's role in publication.

Author and illustrator
{| class="wikitable sortable"
|-
! Year
! Title
! Publisher
! Note
|-
| 1890
| Picturesque Hampshire
| Rowspan=2 | Wade, Warner
| Rowspan=2 | Author in part. Edited by C.F. Warner
|-
| 1891
| Picturesque Franklin
|-
| Rowspan=2 | 1892
| Picturesque Hampden East
| Rowspan=2 | W. F. Adams
| Rowspan=2 | 2 volumes. Author in part
|-
| Picturesque Hampden West
|-
| Rowspan=5 | 1893
| New England Country
| Lee & Shepard
| Reprinted by Lee & Shepard in 1894, 1896, 1897, and 1898 
|-
| The Country School in New England
| D. Appleton & Company
|
|-
| Picturesque Berkshire North
| Rowspan=2 | The W.F. Adams Co.
| Rowspan=2 | 2 volumes. Author in part. Edited by C. F. Warner
|-
| Picturesque Berkshire South
|-
| The Seasons
| Bryant Press
| 
|-
| 1894
| The Farmer's Boy
| D. Appleton & Company
|
|-
| 1896
| What They Say in New England
| Rowspan=2 | Lee & Shepard
| Reprinted by Columbia University Press with an introduction by Carl Withers in 1963
|-
| Rowspan=2 | 1897
|  The Book of Country Clouds and Sunshine
|
|-
| An Unredeemed Captive
| Griffith, Axtell, and Cady
|
|-
| 1899 
| Among English Hedgerows
| Rowspan=9 | Macmillan Publishers
|Reprinted by Chautauqua Press with an introduction by Hamilton W. Mabie in 1914, and by Macmillan in 1925
|-
| 1900
| Along French Byways
| 
|-
| 1901
| The Isle of Shamrock
|
|-
| 1902
| New England and its Neighbors
| Reprinted by Macmillan in 1912
|-
| 1903
| The Land of Heather
| 
|-
| Rowspan=2 | 1904
| Old-Time Schools and School-Books
| Reprinted by Macmillan in 1917, by Peter Smith in 1935, by Columbia University Press with an introduction by Carl Withers in 1963, and by Westphalia Press with an introduction by Rahima Schwenkbeck in 2014
|-
| Highways and Byways of the South
| Reprinted in 1905 by Macmillan
|-
| Rowspan=2 | 1906
| Highways and Byways of the Mississippi Valley
|
|-
| Highways and Byways of the Rocky Mountains"
| Reprinted by Macmillan in 1910
|-
| Rowspan=2 | 1907
| The Farmer's Boy| Rowspan=2 | Thomas Y. Crowell Co.
| Rowspan=2 |Revised edition
|-
| The Country School|-
| 1908
| The Highways and Byways of the Pacific Coast| Rowspan=10 | Macmillan Publishers
| Reprinted by Macmillan in 1913
|-
| 1909
| The Picturesque Hudson|
|-
| 1910
| The Picturesque St. Lawrence|
|-
| 1911
| Highways and Byways of the Great Lakes|
|-
| 1913
| Highways and Byways from the St. Lawrence to Virginia|
|-
| Rowspan=2 | 1915
| Highways and Byways of New England| Reprinted by Macmillan in 1921
|-
|  Highways and Byways of California| Reprint, with a new title page, of Highways and Byways of the Pacific Coast, 1908. Reprinted by Macmillan in 1926
|-
| 1917
| New England: A Human Interest Geographical Reader| 
|-
| 1918
| Highways and Byways of Florida|
|-
| 1919
| What to See in America| Reprinted by Macmillan in 1920
|-
| 1922
| John Burroughs Talks| Houghton Mifflin
| Biography of John Burroughs
|-
| 1932
| Historic Hampshire in the Connecticut Valley| Milton Bradley
|
|-
| 1936
| Hampden County 1636-1936 
| American Historical Society
| 3 volumes
|}

 Illustrator 

 Editor

Editor and Illustrator

Author

References

 Withers, C. (1963). What They Say in New England''. Columbia University Press

External links
 
 Clifton Johnson on the HathiTrust
 Clifton Johnson on the Online Books Page

Bibliographies by writer
Works by Clifton Johnson
Bibliographies of American writers